Arizona was a Eurodance project from England that consisted of remixer/producers Michael Gray and Jon Pearn (both of Full Intention)  and vocalist Zeeteah Massiah (born 24 December 1956 in Barbados).

Biography
Their 1993 club music release "Slide on the Rhythm" (credited to Arizona featuring Zeitia) went to #1 on Billboard 's Hot Dance Music/Club Play chart. In March 1994, "I Specialize In Love" was released and reached #74 in the UK Singles Chart.

They are not to be confused with another funk and soul band of the same name, who recorded an eponymous album for RCA in 1977.

See also
List of Number 1 Dance Hits (United States)
List of artists who reached number one on the US Dance chart

References

British house music groups
British dance music groups
British electronic music groups